Tugana is a genus of Caribbean tangled nest spiders first described by R. V. Chamberlin in 1948.

Species
 it contains four species, found in Cuba and Hispaniola:
Tugana cavatica (Bryant, 1940) – Cuba
Tugana crassa (Bryant, 1948) – Hispaniola
Tugana cudina Alayón, 1992 – Cuba
Tugana infumata (Bryant, 1948) – Hispaniola

References

Amaurobiidae
Araneomorphae genera
Spiders of the Caribbean
Arthropods of the Dominican Republic